The enfant terrible is a character appearing in the tales and myths of many cultures of West and Central Africa, mainly amongst the traditions of the Bambara and Madinka. Recognizable by the unusual circumstances surrounding their birth and an extraordinary precocity the enfant terrible are guilty of transgressive behavior, often destructive or suicidal, leaving the societies from which they spawned helpless to stop them. Depending on circumstances, they may eventually return to the divine world from which they come or change into benevolent powers.

In the West African oral literature
In oral tales and myths in West Africa, the enfant terrible can be a single character or one of a set of twins. It can appear as both a boy or girl. It is always characterized by a peculiar birth, it may be a twin (often the younger of the two) or simply a child prodigy whose gestation has been unordinary. In some stories, the enfant terrible has all his teeth at birth, is immediately able to talk and walk and in some stories is able to give themselves a name. In societies practicing circumcision and/or excision, the enfant terrible is also characterized as uncircumcised. In Bambara traditions, the enfant terrible carry recognizable attributes of clothing such as shells or bracelets and they are attached to the world of the bush where they are considered protected by spirits. 

The two other major characteristics of children are their terrible supernatural force and unusual behavior, often eccentric or evil; they are sometimes themselves the victims. They are often destructive towards the paternal family, will attack their family and friends and will break with traditions, customs and morals. Their behavior sometimes borders on suicidal (sawing off the branch on which they are sitting).

In some stories, the history of enfant terrible are connected to the myths of the land. The child will sometimes metamorphose into lightning or rain to ascend to heaven. In others, they become ultimately beneficial, slaying a dragon that devastated the region or defeating a bird that stole the sun. Stories which include an enfant terrible, include Mwindo from the Congolese oral epic, Akoma Mba the hero of a story from the Fang clan of the Beti-Pahuin peoples and Deng a Sudanese and Malawian rain god.

Analysis
Jacques Chevrier emphasizes the singularity of such "terrible children" in West Africa culture, despite what the phrase "enfant terrible" can evoke among European readers. He explores the fact how initially the enfant terrible although seen as a destructive and benevolent figure can often become the savior. This paradox is explained by the fact that the enfant terrible are from the non-human or divine world and that their actions, no matter how absurd, must be interpreted as signs of superior knowledge.

In the arts
In Ize-Gani tale, published by the Nigerian writer Boubou Hama in 1985, Ize-Gani, the main character of the story, is a terrible child who gradually becomes a benevolent figure. 

L'Enfant terrible, a short animated film by Malawian director Kadiatou Konaté, features an enfant terrible.

References

Bibliography

Mandé mythology